The Booth Brothers is an American southern gospel vocal trio. It was originally formed in 1957 by four brothers but disbanded in 1963. It was reformed in 1990 by one of the original members, Ron Booth, with two of his sons, Michael and Ronnie Booth. Ron Booth retired in 1995, and was replaced by Joseph Smith, who was in turn replaced by Jim Brady, followed by Paul Lancaster. In June 2021, it was announced that Ronnie Booth would be leaving the group and be succeeded by former Gaither Vocal Band lead singer Buddy Mullins.

Group history

The Booth Brothers was initially formed in the 1950s by Ron Booth Sr. with his brothers Charles, James, and Wallace, after they moved to Detroit. However, Ron decided to disband the group in 1963 when he joined The Toney Brothers.

In 1990, Ron's youngest son, Michael (b. October 8, 1971), decided to revive the group with his brother Ronnie II (b. June 28, 1965), and his father. They started performing and touring around Florida and recorded several albums. In 1998, Ron decided to retire and the remaining brothers started looking for a replacement. They recorded several albums with Joseph Smith, who was later replaced by Jim Brady (b. May 19, 1970). Brady remained with them until 2014, at which point he was replaced by Paul Lancaster (b. February 23, 1968).

Original members

Line-ups

Members

Line-ups

2013 Quartet members

Line-ups

Discography

1993: Beyond the Cross
1996: Praise God Anyhow 
1996: One of His Own 
1998: Will You Love Jesus More 
1999: Beyond the Cross [re-issue] 
1999: Walkin' on the Good Side 
1999: Treasure These Moments, Volumes I & II 
1999: Pure and Simple, Volume I 
2000: Pure and Simple, Volume II
2000: This Stage of Grace 
2001: 10th Anniversary Classic Collection 
2002: The Booth Brothers Classic Collection Volume II 
2003: The Booth Brothers 
2003: Live in Lakeland 
2004: Pure Southern Gospel 
2005: The Blind Man Saw It All 
2005: The Booth Brothers Christmas 
2006: Harmony 
2006: Hymns, Pure and Simple 
2007: Trails of Paradise 
2007: Carry On 
2008: Room for More 
2009: 09
2009: Live at Oak Tree
2010: Declaration
2011: Let It Be Known
2012: The Best of the Booth Brothers [Gaither Compilation]
2012: Requested
2012: A Tribute to the Songs of Bill and Gloria Gaither
2012: Greatest Hits - Live
2014: Isaiah 12:2
2015: Still
2016: Between Here And Heaven
2019: Country Roads: Country And Inspirational Favorites
2020: Brotherhood - Recorded with Ernie Haase & Signature Sound
2021: Take Another Step
2022: Speak Jesus

Awards

The Booth Brothers were nominated for a Grammy Award for Best Southern, Country, or Bluegrass Gospel Album for their album Room for More. The album was also nominated for two Dove Awards at the 40th GMA Dove Awards: Southern Gospel Album of the Year and Southern Gospel Recorded Song of the Year.

Other Awards & Recognitions:
1998: The Gospel Voice (Sunrise Award)
1999:New Artist of the Year (SGMA Award)
2002: Trio of the Year (SGMA Award)
2003: Male Group of the Year (SGN Award)
2003: Traditional Song of the Year "Under God" (SGN Award)
2003: Traditional Southern Gospel Album "The Booth Brothers" (SGN Award)
2003: Best Album Cover "The Booth Brothers" (SGN Award)
2004: Best Live Performer of the Year (SGN Award)
2006: Song of the Year "He Saw It All" (SGN Award)
2006: Album of the Year "The Blind Man Saw It All" (SGN Award)
2006: Pacesetter Award (SGN Award)
2006: Male Vocalist of the Year (SGN Award)
2006: Male Group of the Year (SGN Award)
2006: Songwriter of the Year- Jim Brady (SGN Award)
2006: Traditional Southern Song of the Year (SGN Award)
2006: Fan Favorite Artist of the Year (SGN Award)
2006: Song of the Year "He Saw It All" (Singing News Fan Award)
2006: Favorite Trio (SGMA Award)
2006: Album of the Year "The Blind Man Saw It All" (SGMA Award)
2007: Male Vocalist of the Year- Ronnie Booth (Harmony Honors)
2007: Artist of the Year (Harmony Honors)
2007: Song of the Year "He Saw It All" (Harmony Honors)
2007: Male Group of the Year (SGN Award)
2007: Best Live Performer of the Year (SGN Award)
2007: Song of the Year "He Saw It All" (Diamond Award)
2007: Group of the Year (Singing News Fan Award)
2008: Male Vocalist of the Year- Ronnie Booth (SGN Award)
2008: Trio of the Year (Diamond Award)
2008: Tenor of the Year- Michael Booth (Singing News Fan Award)
2008: Lead Vocalist of the Year- Michael Booth (Singing News Fan Award)
2008: Trio of the Year (Singing News Fan Award)
2008: Album of the Year "Carry On" (Singing News Fan Award)
2008: Song of the Year "Look for Me at Jesus Feet" (Singing News Fan Award)
2008: Favorite Artist of the Year (Singing News Fan Award)
2009: 
2016: Southern Gospel Album of the Year "Still" (Dove Award)

Greatest Hits:
The River Keeps A-Rollin'
Livin' For The Moment
If We Never Meet Again
Love Was In The Room
Then I Met The Master
He Saw It All (The Blind Man Song)
All Over The World
Castles In The Sand
Still Feeling Fine
Look For Me At Jesus' Feet
Thank Him For The Miracle
Without The Lord
Sail On
Since Jesus Came
Testify
Amazing Grace
Through It All
In Christ Alone

See also
Booth family
John Wilkes Booth

References

External links
Official website
Booth Brothers Bio at CMT
YouTube
MySpace
The Booth Brothers Blog
Twitter
Facebook

American gospel musical groups
Family musical groups
Musical groups established in the 1950s
Musical groups from Detroit
Southern gospel performers
1950s establishments in Michigan